Saudi Seasons is an initiative launched by The Saudi Commission for Tourism and National Heritage (SCTH). In 2019, 11 festivals were planned to take place in different Saudi regions. The initiative is led and planned by different interrelated Saudi authorities including the Ministry of Culture, General Authority for Entertainment, General Sport Authority and the Saudi Exhibition and Convention Bureau under the leadership of a committee led by Crown Prince Mohammed bin Salman. Saudi Seasons initiative has paved the way towards the Saudi efforts to achieve a high-standard tourism activities in Saudi Arabia. The first season of the initiative, taking place in 2019, will shed the light on the Saudi culture and heritage. Accordingly, the seasons will be held in different Saudi cities that have unique and diverse cultures. The different Saudi Seasons undertaken under this initiative would guarantee seasonal jobs to many young Saudis. For example, Jeddah Season 2019 provided 5,000 job opportunities to young males and females.

Objectives 
The main objectives of the seasons are: 

 To increase the spending on tourism is Saudi Arabia. 
 To provide more job opportunities, either permanent or temporary. 
 To boost business initiatives.
 To activate Tourism in Saudi Arabia.
 To enhance quality of life.

List of seasons 
There are currently 11 seasons as follows:

 Riyadh season.
 Jeddah season.
 Eastern province season.
 Taif season.
 Al Soudah season.
 National Day season.
 Al-Diriyah season.
 Al-Ula season.
 Hail season.
 Ramadan season.
 Eid Al-Fitr season.

References 

Tourism in Saudi Arabia